Macrohammus deyrollei is a species of beetle in the family Cerambycidae, and the only species in the genus Macrohammus. It was described by Thomson in 1879.

References

Lamiini
Beetles described in 1879